Betty Fields  (13 September 1906/1910 – 16 January 1938), born in Rochdale, Lancashire, was a British actress. She was the sister of Gracie Fields. In 1936 she starred in the lead of On Top of the World in a role originally intended for her sister.

Filmography
 Old Spanish Customers (1932)
 Lost in the Legion (1934)
 Tonight's the Night (1932)
 On Top of the World (1936)

References

External links

English film actresses
Year of birth uncertain
1938 deaths